Wyoming Peak is the tallest mountain in the Wyoming Range in the U.S. state of Wyoming. Situated in Bridger-Teton National Forest, a now collapsed fire lookout is located on the summit.

References

Mountains of Lincoln County, Wyoming
Mountains of Wyoming
Bridger–Teton National Forest